The CyVA-1 RNA motif is a conserved RNA structure that was discovered by bioinformatics.
CyVA-1 motifs are found in Cyanobacteria, Acidobacteriota, and Verrucomicrobiota.  Only one example of the RNA is known in any Acidobacterial organism, and only one CyVA-1 RNA was found in any Verrucomicrobial organism.  This could suggest that the RNA is not well-established in these bacterial lineages, or simply reflect the fact that relatively few genome sequences are available for organisms in these phyla.
CyVA-1 RNAs likely function in trans as sRNAs, and organisms commonly have 2 or 3 separate copies of the CyVA-1 RNA motif in their genomes.

References

Non-coding RNA